Sree Dharma Sastha Temple is situated at Thycaud in Thiruvananthapuram City near to Govt. Model School and Govt. Arts College, Kerala, India. This ancient Hindu temple is dedicated to Lord Dharma Sastha (Lord Ayyappa Swamy). The distance from the temple to Thiruvananthapuram International Airport is 8 km and to the Central Railway Station and Bus Station is 1.5 km. The temple is administered by Nair Service Society.

Importance
The presiding deity of this temple is Lord Dharma Sastha who is also known as Lord Ayyappa Swamy. Dharma Sastha is a highly revered deity in South India but these temples are comparatively less. The Sabarimala Lord Ayyappa Swamy temple is well famous and is visited by devotees from all over India and abroad. Thycaud Dharma Sastha temple is visited by large number of devotees every day.

Main deity and sub-deities
Lord Dharma Sastha known also as Ayyappa Swamy is the main deity. Sub-deities are Lord Ganapathy, Lord Vishnu, Lord Shiva, Durga Devi, Lord Hanuman Swamy, Subramanya Swamy, Nagar, Navagraha etc.

Main festivals
Mandala-Makaravilakku are the main festivals in this temple. Shivarathri, Navarathri, Thypooyam, Ashtami Rohini, Hanuman Jayanthi etc. are all celebrated.

Offerings
These include Ganapathi Homam, Archana, Muzhukappu, Pushpanjali, Aravana Payasam, Panchamritham, Paalpayasam. Neerajanam is an important offering in this temple and on all Saturdays there is a heavy rush for this offering. A large number of worshipers perform 'Navagraha Pooja'.

See also
Sasthamangalam Mahadevar Temple
Sreevaraham Lakshmi Varaha

References

Hindu temples in Thiruvananthapuram